

V

Z 

 

V